Georg Friedrich Treitschke (29 August 1776 – 4 June 1842) was a German librettist, translator and lepidopterist. He was born in Leipzig and died in Vienna.

In 1800 he came to the Vienna Hofoper. From 1809 to 1814 he was principal of the Viennese Theater an der Wien. He wrote mostly librettos for Paul Wranitzky, Adalbert Gyrowetz and C. Weigl (Weisenhaus, The Orphanage), and translated many French operas into German. In 1814 he revised the libretto of Fidelio at Ludwig van Beethoven's request.

Entomological works
 with Ochsenheimer, F. (1825): Die Schmetterlinge von Europa, Band 5/1. – Leipzig (Fleischer). XVI + 414 S. 
 Treitschke, F. (1825): Die Schmetterlinge von Europa, Band 5/2. – Leipzig (Fleischer). 447 + [1] S.
 Treitschke, F. (1826): Die Schmetterlinge von Europa, Band 5/3. – Leipzig (Fleischer). IV + 419 + [1] S.
 Treitschke, F. (1827): Die Schmetterlinge von Europa, Band 6/1. – Leipzig (Fleischer). VIII + 444 S.
 Treitschke, F. (1828): Die Schmetterlinge von Europa, Band 6/2. – Leipzig (Fleischer). 319 S.
 Treitschke, F. (1829): Die Schmetterlinge von Europa, Band 7. – Leipzig (Fleischer). VI + 252 S.
 Treitschke, F. (1830): Die Schmetterlinge von Europa, Band 8. – Leipzig (Fleischer). VIII + 312 S.
 Treitschke, F. (1832): Die Schmetterlinge von Europa, Band 9/1. – Leipzig (Fleischer). VIII + 272 S.
 Treitschke, F. (1833): Die Schmetterlinge von Europa, Band 9/2. – Leipzig (Fleischer). 284 S.
 Treitschke, F. (1834): Die Schmetterlinge von Europa, Band 10/1. – Leipzig (Fleischer). X + 286 S.
 Treitschke, F. (1835): Die Schmetterlinge von Europa, Band 10/2. – Leipzig (Fleischer). [2] + 340 S.
 Treitschke, F. (1835): Die Schmetterlinge von Europa, Band 10/3. – Leipzig (Fleischer). [4] + 302 S.
 Treitschke, F. (Hrsg.) (1840-1843): Naturhistorischer Bildersaal des Thierreiches. Nach William Jardine. Vorwort von K. Vogel. 4 Bände. – Pesth und Leipzig (Hartleben). Ca. 770 S., 180 Taf. (360 Abb.). 
 Treitschke, F. (1841): Naturgeschichte der europäischen Schmetterlinge. Schwärmer und Spinner. – Pesth (Hartleben). [9] + XIV + [2] + 222 S., Frontispiz, 30 Taf.

References
Max Mendheim: Treitschke, Georg Friedrich. In: Allgemeine Deutsche Biographie. Vol. 38, Duncker & Humblot, Leipzig 1894, p. 558.

German male musicians
German opera librettists
German lepidopterists
Scientists from Leipzig
German expatriates in Austria
1776 births
1842 deaths
German male dramatists and playwrights
19th-century German dramatists and playwrights
19th-century German male writers
German male non-fiction writers
19th-century German translators
Writers from Leipzig